The 1971 NCAA University Division Swimming and Diving Championships were contested in March 1971 at the Beyer Hall Pool at Iowa State University in Ames, Iowa at the 48th annual NCAA-sanctioned swim meet to determine the team and individual national champions of University Division men's collegiate swimming and diving in the United States.

Indiana again topped the team standings, the Hoosiers' fourth overall title.

Team standings
Note: Top 10 only
(H) = Hosts
Full results

See also
List of college swimming and diving teams

References

NCAA Division I Men's Swimming and Diving Championships
NCAA University Division Swimming And Diving Championships
NCAA University Division Swimming And Diving Championships